Fiend may refer to:
 An evil spirit or demon in religion or mythology
 A person addicted to either a pernicious act, a cause, a hobby or sport

Music
 Fiends (album), by Christian post-hardcore band Chasing Victory
 Fiend (rapper) (born 1976), rapper formerly with No Limit Records
 "Fiend" (song), a 2002 song by Coal Chamber
 "Fiend", a song by Orgy from Candyass
 "Fiend", a song by Pestilence from the album Resurrection Macabre
 "F(r)iend", a song by In Flames from the album Soundtrack to Your Escape
 Fiend, a musical project by Brendan O'Hare

Film
 The Fiend (film), a 1972 British serial killer horror film
 Fiend (film), a 1980 American B movie science fiction horror film

Other
 The Fiend, alter-ego of professional wrestler Bray Wyatt
 The Fiend, a Russian fairy tale
 Fiend (Dungeons & Dragons), a collective term for malicious creatures in the Dungeons & Dragons role-playing game